The Labūnava Forest is a forest in Kėdainiai District Municipality, central Lithuania, located  south east from Labūnava. It consists of smaller forests: the Labūnava Forest (proper), the Kruopiai Forest, the Servydgalis Forest. Most of the forest belongs to the Barupė basin.

As of 1980s, 31 % of the area was covered by birch, 30 % by spruce, 13 % by aspen, 15 % by ash, 11 % by oak, black alder and white alder tree groups. The fauna of the forest consists of wild boar, roe deer, red deer, moose, red fox, hare, also there are black storks, cranes, black kites, perns, white-backed woodpeckers, middle spotted woodpeckers, lesser spotted eagles. The forest is a part of the Labūnava Biosphere Polygon.

References

Forests of Lithuania
Kėdainiai District Municipality